Francis Hueffer (born Franz Carl Christoph Johann Hüffer; 22 May 1845 – 19 January 1889) was a German-English writer on music, music critic, and librettist.

Biography
Hueffer was born in Münster, Germany, on 22 May 1845 to Johann Hermann Hüffer, a politician and editor and his second wife Maria Theresia Julia (Julia) Kaufmann, sister of Leopold Kaufmann, Chief Burgomaster (in German Oberbürgermeister) of Bonn and of Alexander Kaufmann, poet and folklorist. He was the youngest of the ten children born to his parents' marriage. His father had had seven other children from his first marriage to Amalia Hosius. His paternal grandmother Maria Sophia Franziska Hüffer (née Aschendorff) was the daughter of Wilhelm Aschendorff, himself the son of the founder of Aschendorff Verlags (Aschendorff publishing house; now Aschendorff Group). He studied modern philology and music in London, Paris, Berlin, and Leipzig, and earned a Ph.D. in 1869 from the University of Göttingen for a critical edition of the works of Guillem de Cabestant, a 12th-century troubadour.

Following his studies, he moved to London in 1869 as a writer on music, and from 1878 worked as chief music critic for The Times, succeeding James William Davison. He wrote a number of books on music, especially on music history and biography; edited the Great Musicians series for Novello & Co; and translated the correspondence of Richard Wagner and Franz Liszt to English. He also wrote the libretti for several English operas: Alexander Mackenzie's Colomba and The Troubadour, and Frederic Hymen Cowen's Sleeping Beauty. Also succeeding Davison, he became editor of the Musical World in 1886 and actuated a more musically progressive attitude. He fell ill in the summer of 1888 and died of cancer on 19 January 1889.

Hueffer's wife, Catherine Madox Brown, was the daughter of Ford Madox Brown and the half-sister of Lucy Madox Brown and an artist and model associated with the Pre-Raphaelites. Their sons, Ford Madox Hueffer (better known as Ford Madox Ford) and Oliver Madox Hueffer, were writers and their daughter Juliet Catherine Emma Hueffer was the mother of Frank Soskice.

Selected writings
 Richard Wagner and the Music of the Future (1874) (reissued by Cambridge University Press, 2009) (Internet Archive)
 The Troubadours: A History of Provençal Life and Literature in the Middle Ages (1878) (Internet Archive)
 Musical Studies: A Series of Contributions, a collection of his articles from The Times and Fortnightly Review (1880) (reissued by Cambridge University Press, 2009) (Internet Archive)
 Wagner, in the Great Musicians series (1881) (reissued by Cambridge University Press, 2009) (Internet Archive)
 Italian and Other Studies (1883) (Google Books)
 Half a Century of Music in England: Essays Towards a History (1889; 2nd ed. 1898) (reissued by Cambridge University Press, 2009) (Internet Archive)
 Correspondence of Wagner and Liszt (1889; as translator) (reissued by Cambridge University Press, 2009) (Project Gutenberg: vol. 1; vol. 2)

Notes

References

External links
 
 
 
 

1845 births
1889 deaths
English music critics
English music historians
English music journalists
English opera librettists
Writers from Münster
German emigrants to England
University of Göttingen alumni
19th-century British journalists
English male journalists
English male dramatists and playwrights
19th-century English dramatists and playwrights
19th-century English male writers
German music critics
German music historians
German music journalists
German opera librettists
German male journalists
German male dramatists and playwrights
19th-century German dramatists and playwrights
19th-century German male writers
People from the Province of Westphalia